Wahlenbergia aridicola is a small herbaceous plant in the family Campanulaceae native to eastern Australia.

The species is found in New South Wales and South Australia.

References

aridicola
Flora of New South Wales
Flora of South Australia